Ruixinia is an extinct genus of somphospondylan titanosauriform dinosaur from the Early Cretaceous (Barremian) Yixian Formation of China. The genus contains a single species, Ruixinia zhangi. The Ruixinia holotype is a partial articulated skeleton with the most complete series of caudal vertebrae known from any Asian titanosauriform.

Discovery and naming
The Ruixinia holotype specimen, ELDM EL-J009, was found in sediments of the Yixian Formation in Beipiao, Liaoning Province, northeastern China. This locality is dated to the Barremian age of the Early Cretaceous period. The fossil material consists of a partial articulated skeleton including cervical, dorsal, and sacral vertebrae, caudal vertebrae and associated chevrons, dorsal ribs, and a left ilium, pubis, femur, tibia, astragalus, metatarsal V, and possible pedal phalanx. At the time of its description, the fossil material was still partially embedded in matrix, with only the left side of the bones prepared.

In 2022, Ruixinia zhangi was described as a new genus and species of titanosauriform dinosaurs by Jinyou Mo, Feimin Ma, Yilun Yu, and Xing Xu. The binomial honors Ruixin Zhang, a contributor to the Erlianhaote Dinosaur Museum.

Description
Ruixinia was a mid-sized sauropod, with an estimated length of approximately 12 meters.

The neck of Ruixinia was over 4 meters long and consisted of at least 15 cervical vertebrae. Such a high number of cervical vertebrae is similar to Dongbeititan, Euhelopus, and Mamenchisaurus.

The tail of Ruixinia contained at least 52 vertebrae. The last few vertebrae were fused together, an unusual trait in sauropods otherwise only known to occur in some Jurassic Asian sauropods such as Shunosaurus and Mamenchisaurus. However, the structure of the fused vertebrae differs between the three taxa. In Ruxinia, the fused vertebrae form a rodlike structure.

The chevrons are distinctive, particularly that of the 20th caudal vertebra, which has a pentagonal shape.

Classification
Mo et al. (2022) recovered Ruxinia to be a basal titanosaur, placed as the sister taxon of a clade containing Daxiatitan and Xianshanosaurus. However, both Daxiatitan and Xianshanosaurus have also been suggested to have affinities with mamenchisaurids, and Mo et al. noted several similarities between Ruixinia and Mamenchisaurus. Ruixinia was not found to be closely related to either of its contemporaries, Dongbeititan or Liaoningotitan. The cladogram below displays the results of the phylogenetic analyses of Mo et al. (2022).

Paleoecology

Ruixinia is a member of the Jehol Biota. Two other sauropod genera, Dongbeititan and Liaoningotitan, are also known from the Jehol Biota.

References 

Macronarians
Barremian life
Early Cretaceous dinosaurs of Asia
Cretaceous China
Fossil taxa described in 2022
Taxa named by Xu Xing